The 2012–13 CHL season was the 21st season of the Central Hockey League (CHL).

League business
Following the 2011–12 CHL season the number of the teams in the CHL dropped to 10 teams, with the Ray Miron President's Cup-winning Fort Wayne Komets moving to the ECHL along with the Evansville IceMen, the Dayton Gems ceased operations and were replaced by a Federal Hockey League team, the Dayton Demonz, the Rio Grande Valley Killer Bees ceased operations, the Laredo Bucks were moved to St. Charles, Missouri, and would rejoin the league as the St. Charles Chill in the 2013–14 CHL Season.  The Denver Cutthroats joined the CHL to play in their inaugural season.  The CHL eliminated its previous two-conference system consisting of the Berry and Turner conferences and played as a single 10-team league.  For 2013–14, the league added its first ever Canadian team in Brampton, Ontario, just north of Toronto.

Regular season

Standings

Individual statistics

Playoffs

Playoff bracket

Awards

All-CHL Team

A. J. Gale (F), Denver Cutthroats
Mickey Lang (F), Quad City Mallards
Sebastien Thinel (F), Missouri Mavericks
Tyler Ludwig (D), Allen Americans
Kevin Young (D), Wichita Thunder
Aaron Dell (G), Allen Americans

References

 
Central Hockey League seasons
CHL